Ramalina is a genus of greenish fruticose lichens that grow in the form of flattened, strap-like branches. Members of the genus are commonly called strap lichens or cartilage lichens. Apothecia are lecanorine.

Lichen spot tests on the cortex are K−, C−, KC+ dark yellow, and P−.

It is in the Ramalinaceae and in the suborder Lecanorineae.

Distribution
The genus has a widespread distribution. A 2008 estimate placed more than 240 species in Ramalina.

Species

R. ailaoshanensis  – China
R. alisiosae  – Canary Islands
R. americana  – North America
R. andina  – Venezuela
R. arabum 
R. arsenii  – Europe
R. azorica  – Azores
R. australiensis 
R. banzarensis 
R. breviuscula 
R. caespitella  – Australia
R. calcarata  – East Africa
R. calicaris 
R. canalicularis 
R. canariensis 
R. cannonii  – Peninsular Malaysia
R. capitata 
R. carminae 
R. celastri 
R. chihuahuana  – Mexico
R. chiguarensis  – Venezuela
R. chondrina 
R. cinereovirens  – South Korea
R. confirmata 
R. coreana  – Southeast Asia
R. corymbosa 
R. crispata  – Venezuela
R. cuspidata 
R. darwiniana  – Galapagos
R. dilacerata 
R. disparata  – Africa
R. dissimilis  – Tanzania
R. dumeticola  – Africa
R. europaea  – Europe
R. exiguella 
R. exilis  – Japan
R. farinacea 
R. fastigiata 
R. fecunda  – Africa
R. filicaulis  – Australia
R. fimbriata  – East Africa
R. fissa 
R. fragilis  – Galapagos
R. fraxinea 
R. furcellangulida  – Galapagos
R. gallowayi 
R. geniculatella  – Saint Helena
R. glaucescens 
R. gloriosensis  – Scattered Islands
R. hengduanshanensis 
R. hivertiana  – Scattered Islands
R. hoehneliana 
R. hyrcana 
R. inclinata 
R. inflata 
R. intermedia 
R. intestiniformis  – Korea
R. ketner-oostrae  – Saint Helena
R. krogiae  – Canary Islands
R. labiosorediata  – North America
R. lacera 
R. leiodea 
R. litorea 
R. lopezii  – Venezuela
R. luciae 
R. mahoneyi 
R. maritima  – Africa
R. marteaui  – Scattered Islands
R. menziesii 
R. meridionalis 
R. microphylla  – Venezuela
R. nervulosa 
R. obtusata 
R. osorioi 
R. pacifica  – Japan
R. panizzei 
R. peruviana 
R. pollinaria 
R. polyforma  – Galapagos
R. polymorpha 
R. portuensis 
R. psoromica  – Mexico
R. qinlingensis  – China
R. quercicola 
R. reducta  – Africa
R. reptans  – Hawaii
R. rigidella  – Saint Helena
R. ryukyuensis  – Japan
R. sanctae-helenae  – Saint Helena
R. santanensis  – Venezuela
R. sarahae  – Channel Islands (California)
R. seawardii  – Hong Kong
R. siliquosa 
R. sphaerophora  – Korea
R. stevensiae  – Norfolk Island
R. stoffersii 
R. subdecumbens  – South Korea
R. subfarinacea 
R. subfraxinea 
R. subrotunda  – Hawaii
R. tapperii  – East Africa
R. tenella 
R. tenuissima  – Venezuela
R. throwerae  – Hong Kong
R. tovarensis  – Venezuela
R. translucida  – East Africa
R. tropica  – Australia
R. unilateralis 
R. usnea 
R. whinrayi  – Australia
R. wirthii  – Azores
R. yokotae  – Japan
R. zollingeri

References

 
Lecanorales genera
Lichen genera
Taxa described in 1809
Taxa named by Erik Acharius